Narosa is a genus of moths of the family Limacodidae described by Francis Walker in 1855.

Description
Antennae ciliated in male, simple in female. Palpi reaching vertex of head. Mid tibia with one pair of spurs, hind tibia with two pairs. Forewing with veins 7, 8 and 9 stalked. Hindwing with veins 6 and 7 stalked.

Selected species
Narosa albescens
Narosa albidens Holloway, 1990
Narosa ambigua
Narosa argentipuncta
Narosa aroa
Narosa barnsi
Narosa castanea
Narosa concinna Swinhoe, 1901
Narosa conspersa Walker, 1855
Narosa doenia
Narosa edoensis
Narosa erminea
Narosa fletcheri
Narosa fulgens (Leech, 1889)
Narosa harmani Holloway, 1986
Narosa hedychroa
Narosa irrorata
Narosa lawaii Holloway, 1986
Narosa nagani Holloway, 1986
Narosa narcha
Narosa nephochloeropis
Narosa nigricristata
Narosa nigrisigna (Wileman, 1911)
Narosa nitobei Shiraki, 1913
Narosa pectinata
Narosa penicillata
Narosa rosipuncta Holloway, 1986
Narosa rufifascia
Narosa silati Holloway, 1986
Narosa talboti
Narosa trilinea
Narosa velutina Walker, 1862
Narosa viridana

References 

 , 2009: The Limacodidae of Vietnam. Entomofauna Supplement 16: 33-229.

Limacodidae genera
Limacodidae